Francis William Steer, OStJ, FSA (10 August 1912 – 23 September 1978) was an English antiquarian, archivist, and herald.

From 1953 Steer was archivist and librarian to the bishop, dean, and chapter of Chichester. In 1956, he became archivist and librarian to the Duke of Norfolk at Arundel. Though he had never attended university, in 1959 Steer was awarded a Lambeth degree by Archbishop Geoffrey Fisher in recognition of his work, and subsequently received both an MA from the University of Oxford in 1974 and a doctorate from the University of Sussex in 1978. The Duke of Norfolk appointed him Maltravers Herald Extraordinary.

Among Steer's many publications is the catalogue of the archives of New College, Oxford, which he had ordered for many years.

A memorial plaque in New College recognises Steer's work for the college. An oil painting of him by Audrey Jennings can be seen in the West Sussex Record Office.

References

English antiquarians
English archivists
1912 births
1978 deaths
Alumni of the University of Sussex
20th-century antiquarians